The following article describes in detail the discography of Delirious?, including all of their studio albums, live albums, compilation albums, singles, and other various releases.

Studio albums
Note: All certifications based on current data from the RIAA's website and the CRIA's website

Live albums

Compilation albums

Singles

Music videos

References

External links
 Official site 

Discographies of British artists

Rock music group discographies
Christian music discographies